Aquisalimonas lutea is a Gram-negative, moderately halophilic, strictly aerobic and motile bacterium from the genus of Aquisalimonas which has been isolated from water of a saltern from Santa Pola in Spain.

References 

Chromatiales
Bacteria described in 2015
Halophiles